The Victoria Affair (code name Operation Iron Law) was a military operation conducted by the Israel Defense Forces (IDF) in March 2011 in which the Israeli Navy intercepted the vessel Victoria on the international waters in the Mediterranean, and discovered concealed weapons which, according to the IDF, were destined for Palestinian militant organizations in the Gaza Strip. The vessel was found to be carrying approximately 50 tons of weapons, including C-704 anti-ship missiles, rocket launchers, radar systems, mortar shells and rifle ammunition.

Background
Israel maintains a naval blockade of the Gaza Strip to prevent the smuggling of arms into the hands of militant organizations based there. In 2003, Israeli commandos intercepted the Karine A in the Red Sea, and seized 50 tons of missiles, mortars, rifles and ammunition which it said were destined for Gaza. In 2009, the Israeli navy intercepted the Iranian vessel Francop off the coast of Cyprus, carrying hundreds of tons of weapons. Iran is Hamas's main arms provider, smuggling weapons overland through Sudan and Sinai in addition to using the sea route.

Operation

Israeli commanders were acting on intelligence reports indicating that 39 of the 100 containers on deck were loaded with Iranian weapons while at port in Syria, and were to be transferred to Hamas. The Victoria was seized about 200 nautical miles from the Israeli coast, while on its way from Turkey to El-Arish port in Egypt (other sources give the destination as Alexandria, Egypt). According to the IDF, the ship picked up the cargo in the Port of Latakia in Syria and sailed to Mersin, Turkey. The ship was intercepted by Israeli Navy missile ships, which radioed the captain and questioned him about his point of origin and planned destination, then informed him that his ship was suspected of carrying illegal cargo, and requested permission to board for an inspection. The captain agreed, and ordered the vessel stopped. Several minutes later, speedboats carrying commandos from Israel's elite naval unit, Shayetet 13, pulled alongside the ship. A ladder was dropped for them to climb aboard. The commandos boarded with their weapons at the ready out of concern that there could be Iranian or Hamas operatives on board. The commandos ordered the crew to assemble on the bridge, and then began inspecting the cargo.  The IDF said the ship's crew was unaware it was carrying concealed weapons. The ship was redirected to the Port of Ashdod for further inspection. After the contraband was unloaded, Israel announced it would release the Victoria and allow it to continue its journey to the Egyptian port of Alexandria.

According to the IDF's Deputy Navy Commander Rear Admiral Rani Ben-Yehuda, the weapons may have been transported from Iran to Syria several weeks earlier, when two Iranian warships sailed through the Suez Canal.

The shipment

Concealed in three containers hidden beneath cotton bags and lentils produced in Syria were the following weapon systems:
 6 C-704 anti-ship missiles
 230 mortar shells, caliber 120 mm
 2,270 mortar shells, caliber 60 mm
 2 radar systems manufactured in England
 2 rocket launchers
 2 hydraulic mounting cranes for the radar system
 66,960 7.62×39mm rounds (Commonly used in the AKM).

According to the IDF, the weapons were accompanied by user manuals in Persian. The packing slip for the 60mm mortar also included a range table for use with a model AZ111-A2 impact fuse, made exclusively by Iran. In an attempt to mislead would-be inspectors, "Made in Britain" labels were attached to all of the crates.

The C-704 missile has a range of 35 kilometers, and a 130 kilogram explosive warhead capable of sinking a 1,000-ton ship. According to The Jerusalem Post, had the six missiles the ship was carrying arrived in the Gaza Strip, they "would have forced the navy to change the way it operates. It now operates just a few kilometers from shore; this would no longer be possible".

Responses
 : The Israeli Foreign Ministry instructed its ambassador to the UN to file a complaint to the UN Security Council's sanctions committee over Iran's efforts to smuggle arms to the Gaza Strip, as a violation of UNSC resolution 1747, which forbids Iran to export arms.
 : Iran's Chief of Staff General Ataollah Salehi denied the allegations that Iran was behind the shipment and was quoted as saying "Israel is a regime based on a lie, and it manufactures lies and fabrications"
 : Spokesman for the U.S. State Department Mark C. Toner released a press statement saying: "In light of the recent seizure of advanced arms and related material by Israel and Egypt bound for terrorist groups, the United States reiterates its strong condemnation of illicit smuggling activities. We underscore that all countries have obligations under relevant United Nations Security Council resolutions to prevent such trafficking in arms and ammunition. Iran, in particular, is prohibited by United Nations Security Council resolution 1747 from exporting any arms and related materials. Any activity to the contrary is another example of Iran’s destabilizing activities in the region. We call upon all regional countries to enforce these obligations. We will continue to work closely with our partners to prevent the shipment of arms to terrorist groups."

See also
 Operation Four Species - Similar seizure of Iranian weaponry on the high seas
 Karine A affair - Similar seizure of Iranian weaponry  on the high seas
 Santorini affair - Similar seizure of Gaza-bound weapons  on the high seas
 Annie Larsen
 Boka Star
 Chong Chon Gang
 United Nations Security Council Resolution 1747

References

External links

 IDF's YouTube channel's section of the Victoria Affair – videos from the IDF's footage, YouTube
 Weapons-Carrying Ship Victoria Anchored at Ashdod - published on 16 March 2011 IDF Spokesperson's Unit

March 2011 events in Asia
2011 in Israel
2011 in the Gaza Strip
Arms trafficking
Battles and conflicts without fatalities
Cross-border operations
Counterterrorism in Israel
Maritime incidents in Israel
Maritime incidents in 2011
Military operations of the Israeli–Palestinian conflict
Operations involving Israeli special forces
Iran–Israel proxy conflict
Israeli Navy